Henry Storm Taylor (11 December 1856 – 16 November 1896) was an English first-class cricketer, who played three  matches for Yorkshire County Cricket Club in 1879.

Born in Scarborough, Yorkshire, England, Taylor was a right-handed batsman, who scored 36 runs at 7.20, with a best of 22 against Surrey. His right arm medium bowling was not called upon.

Taylor died in November 1896 in Great Lever, Bolton, Lancashire, aged 39.

References

External links
Cricinfo Profile

1856 births
1896 deaths
Yorkshire cricketers
People from Great Lever
Cricketers from Scarborough, North Yorkshire
English cricketers of 1864 to 1889
English cricketers